Crystal Vanessa Demopoulos (born September 22, 1988) is an American female mixed martial artist who competes in the Strawweight division of the Ultimate Fighting Championship.

Background 
Born in Cleveland, Ohio, her parents and paternal grandparents raised her in Greece, as she is half Greek herself and Greek is her first language. After she got involved with drugs and became homeless as a teenager, she followed in her mother's footsteps at the age of 18 and became an exotic dancer, continuing in the profession until right before her appearance at UFC 270.

Demopoulos started training in MMA around the age of 21, however her childhood was filled with fighting, even getting kicked out of schools for fighting.

Mixed martial arts career

Early career
In her MMA debut at Iron Tiger Fight Series 79, she faced Emme Weber and went on to submit her in the first round via armbar. She made her Legacy Fighting Alliance debut at LFA 52, losing via unanimous decision to Itzel Sequivel. In her second appearance with LFA at LFA 62, She defeated Valerie Soto via majority decision. At LFA 69, she submitted Nadine Mandaiu in the first round via armbar, before defeating Loveth Young at LFA 81 via unanimous decision.

Demopoulos faced Sam Hughes for the inaugural LFA Women's Strawweight Championship on July 17, 2020 at LFA 85. She won the bout after chocking Hughes unconscious in the 4th round via inverted triangle choke.

On 11 August 2020, Demopoulos appeared on Dana White's Contender Series 28 against Cory McKenna. She lost the bout via unanimous decision.

In the next bout at LFA 94, Demopoulos attempted to defend the LFA Women's Strawweight Championship against Lupita Godinez, losing the close bout and the belt via majority decision.

She rebounded from the loss, defeating Cynthia Arceo in 37 seconds via TKO stoppage at LFA 103 on March 26, 2021.

Demopoulos was booked to face Kathryn Paprocki on August 27, 2021 at LFA 114, however she was called to fight on short notice in the UFC.

Ultimate Fighting Championship 
Demopoulos made her promotional debut on short notice replacing Tracy Cortez against JJ Aldrich on August 28, 2021 at UFC on ESPN 30. She lost the fight via unanimous decision.

Demopoulos was scheduled to face Ashley Yoder on January 15, 2022 at UFC on ESPN 32. However, Yoder withdrew from the event for undisclosed reasons and she was replaced by Silvana Gómez Juárez. The bout was pushed back to UFC 270 a few days before the event. She won the bout via armbar in the first round.

Demopoulos faced Jinh Yu Frey on June 25, 2022 at UFC on ESPN 38. She won the bout via split decision.

Demopoulos faced Maria Oliveira on November 19, 2022 at UFC Fight Night 215. She won the fight via unanimous decision.

Demopoulos is scheduled to face  Karolina Kowalkiewicz on May 13, 2023 at UFC Fight Night 225.

Championships and accomplishments
 Legacy Fighting Alliance (LFA)
 LFA Women's Strawweight Champion (one time; former)
Ultimate Fighting Championship
Performance of the Night (One time)

Mixed martial arts record

|Win
|align=center|9–4
|Maria Oliveira
|Decision (unanimous)
|UFC Fight Night: Nzechukwu vs. Cuțelaba
|
|align=center|3
|align=center|5:00
||Las Vegas, Nevada, United States
|
|-
|Win
|align=center|8–4
|Jinh Yu Frey
|Decision (split)
|UFC Fight Night: Tsarukyan vs. Gamrot
|
|align=center|3
|align=center|5:00
|Las Vegas, Nevada, United States
|
|-
|Win
|align=center|7–4
|Silvana Gómez Juárez
|Submission (armbar)
|UFC 270
|
|align=center|1
|align=center|2:25
|Anaheim, California, United States
|
|-
|Loss
|align=center|6–4
|JJ Aldrich
|Decision (unanimous)
|UFC on ESPN: Barboza vs. Chikadze
|
|align=center|3
|align=center|5:00
|Las Vegas, Nevada, United States
|
|-
|Win
|align=center|6–3
|Cynthia Arceo
|TKO (punches)
|LFA 103
|
|align=center|1
|align=center|0:37
|Shawnee, Oklahoma, United States
|
|-
|Loss
|align=center|5–3
|Lupita Godinez
|Decision (majority)
|LFA 94
|
|align=center| 5
|align=center| 5:00
|Park City, Kansas, United States
|
|-
|Loss
|align=center|5–2
|Cory McKenna
|Decision (unanimous)
|Dana White's Contender Series 28
|
|align=center|3
|align=center|5:00
|Las Vegas, Nevada, United States
|
|-
|Win
|align=center|5–1
|Sam Hughes
|Technical Submission (inverted triangle choke)
|LFA 85
|
|align=center|4
|align=center|2:21
|Sioux Falls, South Dakota, United States
|
|-
|Win
|align=center|4–1
|Loveth Young
|Decision (unanimous)
|LFA 81
|
|align=center|3
|align=center|5:00
|Costa Mesa, California, United States
| 
|-
|Win
|align=center|3–1
|Nadine Mandiau
|Submission (armbar)
|LFA 69
|
|align=center|1
|align=center|2:37
|Cabazon, California, United States
|
|-
|Win
|align=center|2–1
|Valerie Ann Marie Soto
|Decision (majority)
|LFA 62
|
|align=center|3
|align=center|5:00
|Dallas, Texas, United States
|
|-
|Loss
|align=center|1–1
|Itzel Esquivel
|Decision (unanimous)
|LFA 52
|
|align=center|3
|align=center|5:00
|Belton, Texas, United States
|
|-
|Win
|align=center|1–0
|Emme Weber
|Submission (armbar)
|IT Fight Series 79
|
|align=center|1
|align=center|4:36
|Columbus, Ohio, United States
|

See also
 List of current UFC fighters
 List of female mixed martial artists

References

External links
 
 

1988 births
American practitioners of Brazilian jiu-jitsu
Female Brazilian jiu-jitsu practitioners
Living people
Strawweight mixed martial artists
American female mixed martial artists
Mixed martial artists utilizing Brazilian jiu-jitsu
Ultimate Fighting Championship female fighters
21st-century American women
American people of Greek descent